The Los Angeles Chargers are an American football franchise who play in the National Football League (NFL). They began play in Los Angeles in 1960 as charter members of the American Football League (AFL), switched cities to San Diego the following season, and returned to Los Angeles in 2017. The AFL was formed as rivals to the established NFL, though the leagues would later merge, with all AFL teams including the Chargers officially joining the NFL in 1970.

In American football, the quarterback is widely regarded as the most important position, responsible for on-field decision-making as well taking the snap on almost all offensive plays. Only one quarterback can start any given game for each team.

Through the 2021 season, 41 different players have started at least one regular season game at quarterback for the Chargers. Of these, 16 have started at least 10 games, and three (John Hadl, Dan Fouts and Philip Rivers) have started at least 100 games. In the postseason, seven different quarterbacks have started. Rivers holds the franchise records for starts and wins in both the regular season and the postseason. Tobin Rote is the only Charger to start during a title game victory, having done so in the 1963 AFL Championship game.

Summary by year 

The bracketed figures to the right of each name show their record as a starter that season: (wins–losses) or (wins–losses–ties).

Regular season

Post-season

Summary by quarterback 

This is a sortable table. As a default, players are ordered by the date of their first start for the Chargers.

Team career passing records 

Statistics correct through the end of the 2022 NFL season. 1,000 pass attempts minimum. Regular season statistics only.

See also
 List of American Football League players
 List of NFL starting quarterbacks

Notes

References

Los Angeles Chargers

quarterbacks
Los Angeles Chargers players